The women's singles table tennis event at the 2019 Pan American Games was held from August 5 – 7 at the Polideportivo 3 in Lima, Peru..

Results

Finals

Top half

Bottom half

References

External links
Draw results

Women's singles